Perdasdefogu (locally also  ) is a  (municipality) in the Province of Nuoro in the Italian region Sardinia, located about  northeast of Cagliari and about  southwest of Tortolì.

Perdasdefogu borders the following municipalities: Escalaplano, Jerzu, Ulassai, Tertenia.

Close to Perdasdefogu is the Salto di Quirra rocket launch site.

History 
The area was already inhabited in pre-nuragic and nuragic times as evidenced by the presence in the territory of some nuraghes, and various archaeological evidence.

In the Middle Ages it belonged to the Judicate of Cagliari and was part of the curatoria of Sarrabus. At the fall of the giudicato (1258) it passed under the Pisan dominion and subsequently (1323) under the Aragonese dominion. In 1363 the king of Aragon Pietro IV the Ceremonious incorporated the country in the county of Quirra, given in feud to Berengario Carroz. In 1603 the county was transformed in marquisate, as a feud first of the Centelles and then of the Osorio de la Cueva, to which it was redeemed in 1839 with the suppression of the feudal system.

Demography

Longevity 
The town, together with those of Arzana and Villagrande Strisaili in the Ogliastra area, boasts numerous cases of longevity among its inhabitants, with a high number of over-90s. Emblematic is the fact that the longest-lived family in the world comes from this town: the head of the family Consola Melis in 2014 reached 107 years followed by 8 brothers over 90 and over 80 for a total of 828 years; also, her sister Claudia turned 101 in 2014.

References

External links
 
Official website 
 Pro Loco Perdasdefogu 

Cities and towns in Sardinia